Chey Tae-won (born December 3, 1960), also known by his English name Anthony Chey, is a South Korean business magnate. He is the chairman of SK Group, Korea's second largest conglomerate that mainly engages in energy, chemicals, telecommunications, semiconductor, and biopharmaceutical businesses. SK Group has 186 subsidiaries including SK Telecom, SK Hynix, and SK Innovation through SK Inc.(holding company). Chey is well known for the group's SK Hynix merger deal, which eventually becomes the world fourth largest chipmaker behind Samsung Electronics, Intel, and TSMC. As of June 2021, he is the 14th richest person in South Korea with an estimated net worth of US$3.6 billion. The bulk of his fortune comes from SK Inc., holding company of SK Group.

Chey has served as Chairman of the Korea Chamber of Commerce and Industry(KCCI) since March 2021 and has been representing the Korean business community.

Early life and education
Chey was born on December 3, 1960, in Suwon, Gyeonggi Province, as the eldest son of Chey Jong-hyun, chairman of Sunkyung Group (now SK Group). Chey attended Korea University where he received a bachelor's degree in physics, and later he received his Ph.D. in economics at University of Chicago, USA. He joined SK Corp. as a manager, served as executive director of SK America, executive director of SK Corp. and vice president of SK Corp. After the death of Chey Jong-hyun, the former chairman, he took the post of SK chairman at the early age of 38 without a management dispute. It is reported that Chey Yoon-won, the son of founder Chey Jong-gun, appointed Chey Tae-won as the group leader, saying, "Tae-won is the best among our brothers."

Career
Chey has served as Chairman of the SK Group since 1998. For nearly 30 years, Chey has held a number of leadership positions across SK's various operating companies. He had been Chairman of SK Innovation since 2011 and Chairman of SK Hynix since 2012. He has served as Chairman of SK Telecom since February 2022 to accelerate its digital innovation efforts centering on artificial intelligence (AI) technologies. Under his leadership, SK Group has grown into South Korea's second largest corporate group by reforming its holding company system, improving its governance structure through board-centered management, transforming its business structure from a domestic company to an export company, and reestablishing the SK Group Management System (SKMS).

Chairman Chey's management philosophy stresses the importance of creating social as well as economic values, and maximizing the happiness of shareholders, customers, business partners, and employees alike. A recognized and vocal proponent of corporate social value creation, Chey has received numerous special distinctions throughout his career, including “Global Leaders for Tomorrow,” World Economic Forum (1999); Co-chair, East Asia Economic Summit 2002 in Malaysia, World Economic Forum (2002); Member, Brookings International Advisory Council (IAC) (2010); Working Group Convener, G20 Business Summit (2010); and two-time President of the Korea Handball Federation (2008, 2016), as well as many other key acknowledgements.

In May 2022, Chey was appointed by the presidential transition team as the head of the civilian committee to support Busan's bid to host the World Expo in 2030.

Controversies
Chey is married with the daughter of former South Korea president, Roh Tae-woo. They have been separated since September 2011. In December 2015, he announced his intention to divorce. On December 6, 2022, The Seoul Family Court approves divorce. In January 2012, Chey was indicted of embezzling over $40 million from SK companies to cover up trading losses. However, he denies any wrongdoing. In January 2013, Chey was found guilty of embezzlement and was sentenced to 4 years in prison by the Seoul District Court. He was incarcerated near Seoul until his pardon in August 2015

References

Living people
People from Suwon
South Korean billionaires
1960 births
South Korean fraudsters
Korea University alumni
University of Chicago alumni
SK Group people
People convicted of embezzlement
Recipients of South Korean presidential pardons